Hans Joachim Wolf (born September 8, 1940) is an American former cyclist. He competed in the team pursuit event at the 1964 Summer Olympics. Wolf had also won the 1964 Tour of Somerville.

References

External links
 

1940 births
Living people
People from Bad Doberan
People from Mecklenburg
American male cyclists
Olympic cyclists of the United States
Cyclists at the 1964 Summer Olympics
American track cyclists